Spencer Wells (born April 6, 1969) is an American geneticist, anthropologist, author and entrepreneur.  He co-hosts The Insight podcast with Razib Khan.  Wells led The Genographic Project from 2005 to 2015, as an Explorer-in-Residence at the National Geographic Society, and is the founder and executive director of personal genomics nonprofit The Insitome Institute.

Biography

Youth and education
Wells was born in Marietta, Georgia and grew up in Lubbock, Texas. He attended both All Saints School and Lubbock High School, and received a National Merit Scholarship. He obtained a Bachelor of Science in Biology from the University of Texas at Austin in 1988 and a Ph.D. in Biology from Harvard University in 1994. He was a postdoctoral fellow at Stanford University between 1994 and 1998, and a research fellow at the University of Oxford between 1999 and 2000.

Career

Wells did his Ph.D. work under Richard Lewontin, and later did postdoctoral research with Luigi Luca Cavalli-Sforza and Sir Walter Bodmer.  His work, which has helped to establish the critical role played by Central Asia in the peopling of the world, has been published in journals such as Science, American Journal of Human Genetics, and the Proceedings of the National Academy of Sciences.

Wells is renowned for his logistically complex sample-collecting expeditions in remote parts of the world. EurAsia98, which in 1998 took him and his team from London to the Altai Mountains on the Mongolian border, via an overland route through the Caucasus, Iran and the -stans of Central Asia, was sponsored by Land Rover.  In 2005 he led a team of Genographic scientists on the first modern expedition to the Tibesti Mountains in northern Chad, and in 2006 he led a team to the Wakhan Corridor on the Tajik-Afghan border.  His work has taken him to more than 100 countries.

He wrote the book The Journey of Man: A Genetic Odyssey (2002), which explains how genetic data has been used to trace human migrations over the past 50,000 years, when modern humans first migrated outside of Africa. According to Wells, one group took a southern route and populated southern India and southeast Asia, then Australia.  The other group, accounting for 90% of the world's non-African population (some 5.4 billion people as of 2014), took a northern route, eventually peopling most of Eurasia (largely displacing the aboriginals in southern India, Sri Lanka and Southeast Asia in the process), North Africa and the Americas.  Wells also wrote and presented the 2003 PBS/National Geographic documentary of the same name.  Wells has contributed to efforts to determine the date of Y-chromosomal Adam.

From 2005-2015, Wells led The Genographic Project, undertaken by the National Geographic Society, IBM, and the Waitt Foundation, which aimed to create a picture of how our ancestors populated the planet by analyzing DNA samples from around the world. The project is credited with creating the personal genomics industry.

He has presented the results of his work around the world, including at the 2007 TED conference, where he spoke specifically about human diversity. Wells was a keynote speaker at the Science & Technology Summit in The Hague on November 18, 2010.  He also gave the keynote address at the University of Texas College of Natural Sciences commencement exercises on May 21, 2011.

Wells was one of the keynote speakers at the Southern California Genealogical Society (SCGS) Jamboree that was co-sponsored by the International Society of Genetic Genealogy (ISOGG) on June 3, 2013. The focus was on Family History and DNA: Genetic Genealogy in 2013, where he was quoted as saying: Since 2005, the Genographic Project has used the latest genetic technology to expand our knowledge of the human story, and its pioneering use of DNA testing to engage and involve the public in the research effort has helped to create a new breed of "citizen scientist." Geno 2.0 expands the scope for citizen science, harnessing the power of the crowd to discover new details of human population history.

Opposition to Israeli policies and allegations of anti-Semitism

In July 2020, Wells attracted criticism for tweeting that Israel should be bombed “until the sand turns to glass”. Wells was involved in a heated discussion on Twitter, set against a planned Israeli annexation of additional territory in the West Bank. Some of his comments attracted criticism from the online edition of Algemeiner Journal.

The University of Texas at Austin subsequently distanced itself from Wells, stating, "Spencer Wells is no longer a faculty or advisory council member at UT. He previously had a courtesy, unpaid appointment as a part-time adjunct that did not involve teaching. That ended in May and was not renewed. We do not have any association with the views held by Mr. Wells." 

National Geographic subsequently removed all of Wells' content from its site, citing a violation of its journalistic ethics policy.

Personal life
Wells is married to Holly Morse, and the two have lived in Lombok, Indonesia since 2020.  He was previously married to Trendell Thompson (1998-2005), with whom he has two children, Sasha Thompson-Wells and Margot Thompson-Wells; and Pamela Caragol Wells (2005-2015).

Awards and honors
 National Merit Scholar
 Phi Beta Kappa
 Fellow of the Explorers Club
 National Geographic Explorer-in-Residence
 Kistler Prize
 Outstanding Young Texas Ex
 Frank H.T. Rhodes Class of '56 Professorship, Cornell University
 Director of the Texas Lyceum
 Distinguished Alumnus, College of Natural Sciences, University of Texas at Austin

Books
The Journey of Man: A Genetic Odyssey, 2002 (Penguin, UK; Princeton University Press and Random House, US; Fischer Verlag, Germany; Longanesi, Italy; Oceano, Spain/Latin America; Ucila International, Slovenia; Dokoran, Czech Republic; Akkord, Hungary; Oriental Press, China; Basilico, Japan; ScienceBooks, Korea; Yurt, Turkey; CD Press, Romania; Alpina, Russia)
Deep Ancestry:  Inside the Genographic Project, 2006 (National Geographic)
Pandora's Seed:  The Unforeseen Cost of Civilization, 2010 (Random House, US; Penguin, UK; Contact, Netherlands; Codice, Italy; Eksmo, Russia; Nika Center, Ukraine; Commonwealth, Taiwan; Eulyoo, Korea; Kagaku-Dojin, Japan; Shanghai BBT, China)

Films
2000 – The Difference (Channel Four, UK)
2002 – The Real King and Queen (Discovery Channel)
2003 – Journey of Man (PBS/National Geographic Channel) – CINE Golden Eagle award
2004 – Quest for the Phoenicians (PBS)
2005 – Search for Adam (National Geographic Channel)
2007 – China's Secret Mummies (National Geographic Channel) – nominated for Outstanding Historical Programming Emmy
2009 – The Human Family Tree (National Geographic Channel) – nominated for Outstanding Science and Technology Programming Emmy

See also
Recent single-origin hypothesis
Y-chromosomal Adam
The Genographic Project

References

External links

The Genographic Project
Cover article from the December 2004 issue of Discover
Interview about Genghis Khan's Y-chromosome on Radiolab
Interview in PLoS Genetics
Interview on The Colbert Report
Interview on The Daily Show
Talk on personal genomics at the Frontiers Forum 2019

1969 births
Living people
Population geneticists
American geneticists
University of Texas at Austin College of Natural Sciences alumni
Harvard Graduate School of Arts and Sciences alumni
Recent African origin of modern humans
People from Washington, D.C.
Genographic Project